Askov Finlayson is a Minneapolis-based fashion brand and outfitter featuring primarily menswear, men's outdoor apparel, gear and accessories. Askov Finlayson was founded in 2011 by Eric and Andrew Dayton, grandsons of Bruce Dayton and sons of Minnesota governor Mark Dayton.

Askov Finlayson is derived from a combination of the names of two small towns, Askov and Finlayson, in east-central Minnesota who share a freeway exit on Interstate 35, Exit 195.

In 2014, Askov Finlayson was named by Esquire as a Best Men's Store in America. In 2015, GQ named it among The 10 Best Menswear Stores in America. In January 2019, Askov Finlayson’s North Loop store closed, for the company to focus on its own product development and stop selling third-party brands. In November 2019, Askov Finlayson was relaunched as a direct-to-consumer outerwear brand, to eliminate the retail markup and undercut competitors on price.

References

External links 

Clothing companies of the United States
Companies established in 2011
Companies based in Minnesota
2010s fashion
Outdoor clothing brands
Menswear designers
Fashion accessory brands
Luxury brands
High fashion brands
2011 establishments in Minnesota
Clothing companies established in 2011